Palais Royal was an American chain of department stores, owned by Stage Stores, Inc. and headquartered in Houston, TX, that specialized in retailing brand name apparel, accessories, cosmetics, footwear, and housewares.

Brands exclusively found at Palais Royal include Valerie Stevens, Signature Studio, Sun River, Rustic Blue, Rebecca Malone, Wishful Park.

History
The company was founded in 1921 by Isadore Erlich in Shreveport, Louisiana. Upon his death in 1968, his wife, Moselle Erlich (Pollack), took over the presidency. She relinquished the post to Bernard Fuchs in 1979 and was elected chairman. The stores were bought by Wellan's of Alexandria, Louisiana in 1985.

In 1994, the company was purchased by Stage Stores, formerly known as Specialty Retailers Inc., the current owner of the stores.

In 2019, it was announced that parent company Stage Stores Inc planned to convert all Palais Royal stores to the Gordmans banner, along with Stage Stores' other chains.

On May 10, 2020, Stage announced it had filed for Chapter 11 Bankruptcy, and that it would liquidate all locations, Palais Royal and Gordmans included, unless a buyer could be found for the chain. No buyer had been found, and going out of business sales had begun at all locations.

References

External links 
 Official website (Archive)
 A complete company profile from Reuters

Department stores of the United States
Companies based in Houston
American companies established in 1921
1921 establishments in Louisiana
2020 disestablishments in Louisiana
Retail companies established in 1921
Retail companies disestablished in 2020
Companies that filed for Chapter 11 bankruptcy in 2020